This is a list of television broadcasters which provide coverage of the Ligue 1, French football's top-level competition.

France

2022–2024

International broadcasters

International 
One match per-week available internationally on TV5Monde (except Europe).

Americas

Asia and Oceania

Europe

MENA

Sub-Saharan Africa

References 

Association football on television
broadcasters
Ligue 1